The European Mathematical Society (EMS) is a European organization dedicated to the development of mathematics in Europe. Its members are different mathematical societies in Europe, academic institutions and individual mathematicians. The current president is Jan Philip Solovej, professor at the Department of Mathematics at the University of Copenhagen.

Goals
The Society seeks to serve all kinds of mathematicians in universities, research institutes and other forms of higher education.  Its aims are to
Promote mathematical research, both pure and applied,
Assist and advise on problems of mathematical education,
Concern itself with the broader relations of mathematics to society,
Foster interaction between mathematicians of different countries,
Establish a sense of identity amongst European mathematicians,
Represent the mathematical community in supra-national institutions.

The EMS is itself an Affiliate Member of the International Mathematical Union and an Associate Member of the International Council for Industrial and Applied Mathematics.

History

The precursor to the EMS, the European Mathematical Council was founded in 1978 at the International Congress of Mathematicians in Helsinki. This informal federation of mathematical societies was chaired by Sir Michael Atiyah. The European Mathematical Society was founded on 28 October 1990 in Mądralin near Warsaw, Poland, with Friedrich Hirzebruch as founding President. Initially, the EMS had 27 member societies. The first European Congress of Mathematics (ECM) was held at the Sorbonne and Panthéon-Sorbonne universities in Paris in 1992, and is now held every 4 years at different locations around Europe, organised by the EMS. The last ECM (postponed for a year due to the covid pandemic) was in 2021 in Portorož in Slovenia.

Presidents of the EMS
Friedrich Hirzebruch, 1990–1994
Jean-Pierre Bourguignon, 1995–1998
Rolf Jeltsch, 1999–2002
John Kingman, 2003–2006
Ari Laptev, 2007–2010
Marta Sanz-Solé, 2011–2014
Pavel Exner, 2015–2018
Volker Mehrmann, 2019–2022
Jan Philip Solovej, 2023–2026

Structure and Governance
The governing body of the EMS is its Council, which comprises delegates representing all of the societies which are themselves members of the EMS, along with delegates representing the institutional and individual EMS members. The Council meets every 2 years, and appoints the President and Executive Committee who are responsible for the running of the society.

Besides the Executive Committee, the EMS has standing committees on: Applications and Interdisciplinary Relations, Developing Countries, Mathematical Education, ERCOM (Directors of European Research Centres in the Mathematical Sciences), Ethics, European Solidarity, Meetings, Publications and Electronic Dissemination, Raising Public Awareness of Mathematics, Women in Mathematics.

The EMS's rules are set down in its Statutes and Bylaws. The EMS is headquartered at the University of Helsinki.

Prizes

The European Congress of Mathematics (ECM) is held every four years under the Society's auspices, at which ten EMS Prizes are awarded to "recognize excellent contributions in Mathematics by young researchers not older than 35 years".

Since 2000, the Felix Klein Prize (endowed by the Institute for Industrial Mathematics in Kaiserslautern) has been awarded to "a young scientist or a small group of young scientists (normally under the age of 38) for using sophisticated methods to give an outstanding solution, which meets with the complete satisfaction of industry, to a concrete and difficult industrial problem."

Since 2012, the Otto Neugebauer Prize (endowed by Springer Verlag) has been awarded to a researcher or group of researchers '"for highly original and influential work in the field of history of mathematics that enhances our understanding of either the development of mathematics or a particular mathematical subject in any period and in any geographical region".

The following are the awardees so far, (a F symbol denotes mathematicians who later earned a Fields Medal).

1992 prizes

EMS Prizes: Richard Borcherds (UK)F – Jens Franke (Germany) – Alexander Goncharov (Russia) – Maxim Kontsevich (Russia)F – François Labourie (France) – Tomasz Łuczak (Poland) – Stefan Müller (Germany) – Vladimír Šverák (Czechoslovakia) – Gábor Tardos (Hungary) – Claire Voisin (France)

1996 prizes

EMS Prizes: Alexis Bonnet (France) – Timothy Gowers (UK)F – Annette Huber-Klawitter (Germany) – Aise Johan de Jong (Netherlands) – Dmitry Kramkov (Russia) – Jiří Matoušek (Czech Republic) – Loïc Merel (France) – Grigori Perelman (Russia)F, declined – Ricardo Pérez-Marco (Spain/France) – Leonid Polterovich (Russia/Israel)

2000 prizes

EMS Prizes: Semyon Alesker (Israel) – Raphaël Cerf (France) – Dennis Gaitsgory (Moldova) – Emmanuel Grenier (France) – Dominic Joyce (UK) – Vincent Lafforgue (France) – Michael McQuillan (UK) – Stefan Nemirovski (Russia) – Paul Seidel (UK/Italy) – Wendelin Werner (France)F

Felix Klein Prize: David C. Dobson (USA)

2004 prizes

EMS Prizes: Franck Barthe (France) – Stefano Bianchini (Italy) – Paul Biran (Israel) – Elon Lindenstrauss (Israel)F – Andrei Okounkov (Russia)F – Sylvia Serfaty (France) – Stanislav Smirnov (Russia)F – Xavier Tolsa (Spain) – Warwick Tucker (Australia/Sweden) –  (Germany)

Felix Klein Prize: Not Awarded

2008 prizes
EMS Prizes: Artur Avila (Brazil)F – Alexei Borodin (Russia) – Ben J. Green (UK) – Olga Holtz (Russia) – Boáz Klartag (Israel) – Alexander Kuznetsov (Russia) – Assaf Naor (USA/Israel) – Laure Saint-Raymond (France) – Agata Smoktunowicz (Poland) – Cédric Villani (France)F

Felix Klein Prize:  Josselin Garnier (France)

2012 prizes
EMS Prizes: Simon Brendle (Germany) - Emmanuel Breuillard (France) - 
Alessio Figalli (Italy)F - Adrian Ioana (Romania) - Mathieu Lewin (France) - Ciprian Manolescu (Romania) - Grégory Miermont (France) - Sophie Morel (France) - Tom Sanders (UK) - Corinna Ulcigrai (Italy) -

Felix Klein Prize:  Emmanuel Trélat (France)

Otto Neugebauer Prize: Jan P. Hogendijk (Netherlands)

2016 prizes
EMS Prizes: Sara Zahedi (Iran-Sweden) - Mark Braverman (Israel) - Vincent Calvez (France) - Guido de Philippis (Italy) - Peter Scholze (Germany)F - Péter Varjú (Hungary) - Thomas Willwacher (Germany) - James Maynard (UK)F - Hugo Duminil-Copin (France)F - Geordie Williamson (Australia)

Felix Klein Prize:  Patrice Hauret (France)

Otto Neugebauer Prize: Jeremy Gray (UK)

2020 prizes
EMS Prizes:     Karim Adiprasito (Germany) - Ana Caraiani (Romania) - Alexander Efimov (Russia) - Simion Filip (Moldova) - Aleksandr Logunov (Russia) - Kaisa Matomäki (Finland) - Phan Thành Nam (Vietnam) - Joaquim Serra (Spain) - Jack Thorne (UK) - Maryna Viazovska (Ukraine)F

Felix Klein Prize:  Arnulf Jentzen (Germany)

Otto Neugebauer Prize: Karine Chemla (France)

National societies holding full membership in EMS

Austrian Mathematical Society
Belgian Mathematical Society
Belgian Statistical Society
Bosnian Mathematical Society
Union of Bulgarian Mathematicians
Croatian Mathematical Society
Cyprus Mathematical Society
Czech Mathematical Society
Danish Mathematical Society
Edinburgh Mathematical Society
Estonian Mathematical Society
Finnish Mathematical Society
Société Mathématique de France
Society of Applied & Industrial Mathematicians (GAMM)
Georgian Mathematical Union
German Mathematical Society
Hellenic Mathematical Society
Icelandic Mathematical Society
Institute of Mathematics and its Applications
Irish Mathematical Society

Israel Mathematical Union
Italian Association of Mathematics Applied to Economic and Social Sciences (AMASES)
Società Italiana di Matematica Applicata e Industriale (SIMAI)
Italian Mathematical Union
János Bolyai Mathematical Society
Kosovar Mathematical Society
Latvian Mathematical Society
Lithuanian Mathematical Society
London Mathematical Society
Luxembourg Mathematical Society
Malta Mathematical Society
Moscow Mathematical Society
Norwegian Mathematical Society
Norwegian Statistical Association
Polish Mathematical Society
Portuguese Mathematical Society
Real Sociedad Matemática Española (Royal Spanish Math. Society)
Romanian Mathematical Society

Royal Dutch Mathematical Society
Slovak Mathematical Society
Slovenian Discrete and Applied Mathematics Society
Société de Mathématiques Appliquées et Industrielles (SMAI)
Sociedad Española de Matemática Aplicada (Spanish Soc. of Appl. Math.)
Societat Catalana de Matemàtiques (Catalan Society of Mathematics)
Society of Mathematicians and Physicists of Montenegro
Spanish Society of Statistics and Operations Research
St. Petersburg Mathematical Society
Svenska Matematikersamfundet (Swedish Mathematical Society)
Swiss Mathematical Society
The Society of Mathematicians, Physicists and Astronomers of Slovenia
Turkish Mathematical Society
Ukrainian Mathematical Society

Publications
The EMS is the sole shareholder of the publisher EMS Press that publishes over 25 academic journals, including:
 Algebraic Geometry
 Annales de l’Institut Henri Poincaré C
 Annales de l’Institut Henri Poincaré D
 Commentarii Mathematici Helvetici
 Documenta Mathematica
 Elemente der Mathematik
 EMS Surveys in Mathematical Sciences
 Groups, Geometry, and Dynamics
 Interfaces and Free Boundaries
 Journal of Combinatorial Algebra
 Journal of Fractal Geometry
 Journal of Noncommutative Geometry
 Journal of Spectral Theory
 Journal of the European Mathematical Society
 L’Enseignement Mathématique
 Mathematical Statistics and Learning
 Memoirs of the European Mathematical Society
 Oberwolfach Reports
 Portugaliae Mathematica
 Publications of the Research Institute for Mathematical Sciences
 Quantum Topology
 Rendiconti del Seminario Matematico della Università di Padova
 Rendiconti Lincei - Matematica e Applicazioni
 Revista Matemática Iberoamericana
 Zeitschrift für Analysis und ihre Anwendungen

EMS Press has also published over 200 books in mathematics since 2003, in both print and digital formats.

In addition, it publishes the Magazine of the European Mathematical Society, often called EMS Magazine, formerly known as the Newsletter of the European Mathematical Society which was established in 1991. It features news and expositions of recent developments in mathematical research. It is quarterly and open access. The current editor-in-chief is 
Fernando da Costa (2020–) (succeeding Valentin Zagrebnov (2016–2020)).
The Encyclopedia of Mathematics is also sponsored by the EMS.

See also

List of mathematical societies

References

External links
The European Mathematical Society Homepage
EMS Press
Mathematics in Europe portal by the EMS committee for Raising Public Awareness of Mathematics
History of the EMS
8th European Congress of Mathematics

Mathematical societies
Organizations established in 1990
Mathematics awards
Pan-European learned societies